Aspidistra yingjiangensis is a species of Aspidistra that is found in China. The plant's leaves are green with pale yellow spots that are narrowly oblanceolate and it has two or three bracts. The flowers are individual or paired.

External links
Flora of China

yingjiangensis